The 2009 World Group II Play-offs were four ties which involved the losing nations of the World Group II and four nations from the three Zonal Group I competitions. Nations that won their play-off ties entered the 2010 World Group II, while losing nations joined their respective zonal groups.

Belgium vs. Canada

Estonia vs. Israel

Poland vs. Japan

Australia vs. Switzerland

See also
Fed Cup structure

References

World Group II Play-offs